Eric Muller may refer to:

 Eric L. Muller (born 1962), law professor at the University of North Carolina School of Law
 Erik Möller (born 1979), German freelance journalist, software developer and author
 Svend Erik Møller (1909–2002), Danish architect
 Erich Muller (born 1966), American radio personality better known by his stage name Mancow Muller